The Treaty of Preobrazhenskoye (or the Treaty of Preobrazhenskoe) was negotiated by Johann Patkul and signed on 22 November 1699 in Preobrazhenskoye (now a part of Moscow), a favoured residence of the tsar Peter the Great. It followed an informal meeting of Peter and Augustus at Rava (Rawa, Rava-Ruska, Rava-Ruskaya) in August 1698. The treaty called for the partition of the Swedish Empire among Denmark-Norway, Russia, Saxony and the Polish–Lithuanian Commonwealth. Following the treaty, the Great Northern War began.

Sources

External links
Scan of the treaty at IEG Mainz

1699 treaties
1699 in Europe
Preobr
Preobr
Preobrazhenskoye
1699 in the Polish–Lithuanian Commonwealth
1699 in Russia
Bilateral treaties of Russia